The 1967 Colgate Red Raiders football team was an American football team that represented Colgate University as an independent during the 1967 NCAA University Division football season. In its sixth consecutive season under head coach Hal Lahar (his 11th overall), the team compiled a 2–8 record. Donald Mooradian was the team captain. 

The team played its home games at Andy Kerr Stadium in Hamilton, New York.

Schedule

Leading players 
Statistical leaders for the 1967 Red Raiders included: 
 Rushing: Ronald Burton, 453 yards and 3 touchdowns on 146 attempts
 Passing: Ronald Burton, 954 yards, 66 completions and 2 touchdowns on 149 attempts
 Receiving: Dean Taylor, 255 yards on 18 receptions
 Total offense: Ronald Burton, 1,407 yards (954 passing, 453 rushing)
 Scoring: Ronald Burton, 30 points from 5 touchdowns
 All-purpose yards: Marvin Hubbard, 613 yards (329 rushing, 152 receiving, 132 kickoff returning)

References

Colgate
Colgate Raiders football seasons
Colgate Red Raiders football